Peter Murphy  (born July 15, 1949) is an American politician and member of the Democratic Party who previously represented district 28 in the Maryland House of Delegates. In 2014, he was elected President of the Charles County Board of Commissioners.

Background

Murphy was born in Washington, D.C., on July 15, 1949. He has both a B.A. and an M.A. from the American University, and an Ed.S. Degree in Counseling from George Washington University. 
He began his non-political career as a microbiologist for the National Institutes of Health. There he developed a strong interest in teaching and education and went on to teach science and math at General Smallwood Middle School in Indian Head, Maryland. He later directed a large educational testing program at George Washington University.

In the legislature
Member of House of Delegates since January 10, 2007. Member, Ways and Means Committee, 2007- (education subcommittee, 2007-; transportation subcommittee, 2007-).

Legislative notes
 voted for the Clean Indoor Air Act of 2007 (HB359)
 voted in favor of increasing the sales tax by 20% - Tax Reform Act of 2007 (HB2)
 voted in favor of in-state tuition for illegal immigrants in 2007 (HB6)
 sponsored House Bill 30 in 2007, allowing the state to confiscate unused portions of gift certificates after 4 years.

Personal
Murphy is openly gay. He was one of eight openly LGBT members of the Maryland General Assembly, alongside Sen. Rich Madaleno (D–Kensington) and Dels. Anne Kaiser (D–Burtonsville), Heather Mizeur (D–Takoma Park), Maggie McIntosh (D–Baltimore), Mary L. Washington (D–Baltimore), Bonnie Cullison (D–Silver Spring) and Luke Clippinger (D–Baltimore).

He is a divorced father of two daughters.

References

External links
Maryland legislature: Del. Peter Murphy
electpetermurphy.com/ Official web site

1949 births
Gay politicians
LGBT state legislators in Maryland
Living people
Democratic Party members of the Maryland House of Delegates
21st-century American politicians